Waterloo is the second studio album by the Swedish pop group ABBA, and the first released internationally. It was originally released on 4 March 1974 in Sweden through Polar Music. The album's title track won ABBA the 1974 Eurovision Song Contest and became a global hit, launching the group's career.

Overview
Recording sessions for Waterloo began on 24 September 1973 with the track "Dance (While the Music Still Goes On)". This song was unusual in that it is the only ABBA track not to feature member Benny Andersson on keyboards, instead featuring American pianist John "Rabbit" Bundrick who was in Sweden at the time. Bundrick, however, was not credited on the album. Three weeks later the next two songs ("Suzy-Hang-Around" and "My Mama Said") went into the studio. A recording sheet from the day credits the artist as "ABBA", the first time the name was ever used in writing (the group had previously been called "Björn & Benny, Agnetha & Anni-Frid"), although their manager Stig Andersson had informally been calling them ABBA with the media for some time. The former of these songs marks the only time Benny Andersson sang lead on a track. Two more tracks were recorded on 17 October; "What About Livingstone" and "Honey Honey" – the latter being the second single released from the album in most countries. "King Kong Song" was recorded on 14 November, a song which members Benny Andersson and Björn Ulvaeus today single out as one of their weakest tracks. This was also the date in which it was announced that ABBA were to appear at the Swedish selection for the 1974 Eurovision Song Contest. From that point, recording sessions speeded up and the rest of the tracks were recorded. Two songs were up for consideration for their Eurovision entry; "Waterloo" and "Hasta Mañana". The group preferred the former but felt the latter was a more safe bet. Ultimately they chose "Waterloo" as it was more the direction they wished to take the group. "Waterloo" and "Watch Out" were recorded on the same day, with the latter becoming the B-side to the former.

"Waterloo" swept to victory at the Swedish heats and the group represented Sweden in Brighton for the Eurovision Song Contest 1974. ABBA won the contest and "Waterloo" became not only a massive hit in Europe but all over the world (peaking at No.6 in the US for example). In Sweden, the album had already been released and topped the Swedish album charts for 12 weeks, becoming one of the biggest-selling Swedish albums ever to that point. In the UK the album made No.28, the first time a foreign Eurovision act had charted an album and it performed well in the rest of Europe.

Reviews of the album were positive with Phonograph Records Greg Shaw stating that it "might just turn out to be one of the classic début LPs of the '70s". Rolling Stone also gave the album a favourable review. In a 3-star review, AllMusic said that it was "a beautiful album".

Waterloo was first released on CD in Sweden in 1988 alongside Ring Ring and the self titled album. It is the only CD version of the album to follow the original Scandinavian LP's running order. Polydor first released Waterloo, along with Ring Ring, throughout Europe in 1990, with the discs being pressed in West Germany. These discs follow the running order of the Waterloo LP that was released in The Netherlands, swapping Watch Out and What About Livingstone? in the tracklist. In 1995, Polydor reissued their pressings of all of ABBA's albums in the United States. The album has been reissued in digitally remastered form several times: in 1997 as part of "The ABBA Remasters" series, then in 2001 with an updated cover artwork and some bonus tracks, again in 2005 as part of The Complete Studio Recordings box set, and most recently in 2014 as a 40th anniversary "Deluxe Edition" reissue. This version of the album entered the UK album charts.

The cover features the sub-title "Björn, Benny, Agnetha & Frida" although some editions replaced 'Agnetha' with 'Anna' – by which Agnetha Fältskog was known in some countries.

Track listing

Notes
 The international LP edition omits the Swedish version of Waterloo and moved the English version to the start of side one.
 The American LP edition utilises the international tracklisting but added the US remix of  "Ring Ring" to the end of side two.
 The UK LP edition utilises the international tracklisting but added the original English version of  "Ring Ring" to the end of side two.
 The 1990 edition issued by Polydor swapped the tracks "Watch Out" and "What About Livingstone?"
 The 2001 edition swaps the respective versions of the title track so that the CD begins with the English version.

Personnel
 Agnetha Fältskog – vocals
 Anni-Frid Lyngstad – vocals
 Björn Ulvaeus – acoustic guitar, guitar, vocals
 Benny Andersson – piano, keyboards, Moog synthesizer, mellotron, clavinet, vocals

Additional musicians
 Ola Brunkert – drums
 Malando Gassama – congas and güiro on "Sitting in the Palmtree", tambourine on "Hasta manana" 
 Rutger Gunnarsson – bass
 Janne Schaffer – electric guitars
 Per Sahlberg – percussion and bass on "Dance (While the Music Still Goes On)"
 John "Rabbit" Bundrick – keyboards on "Dance (While the Music Still Goes On)" (not credited on the album sleeve)
 Christer Eklund – tenor saxophone on "Waterloo"
 Sven-Olof Walldoff – string arrangement on "Honey, Honey"

Production
 Benny Andersson & Björn Ulvaeus – producers
 Michael B. Tretow – engineer
 Ola Lager – photography
 Ron Spaulding – original album design
 Jon Astley; Tim Young; Michael B. Tretow – remastering for the 1997 Remasters
 Jon Astley; Michael B. Tretow – remastered for the 2001 Remasters
 Henrik Jonsson – remastering for The Complete Studio Recordings box set

Charts

Weekly charts

Year-end charts

Certifications and sales

References

External links
 

ABBA albums
Polar Music albums
1974 albums
Albums produced by Björn Ulvaeus
Albums produced by Benny Andersson
Atlantic Records albums
Epic Records albums